Stephen A. Kent  is a professor in the Department of Sociology at the University of Alberta in Edmonton, Alberta, Canada. He researches new religious movements (NRMs), and has published research on several such groups including the Children of God (The Family), the Church of Scientology, and other NRMs operating in Canada.

Education
Kent graduated from the University of Maryland, College Park in 1973, with a B.A. degree in sociology and a minor in social and political theory. In 1978, he was awarded a master's degree in the history of religions from American University. Kent was also awarded an M.A. in 1980 from McMaster University with a focus in religion and modern Western society and a minor in Indian Buddhism; he was granted a Ph.D. in religious studies in 1984 from the same institution. From 1984 to 1986, Kent held an Izaac Walton Killam Postdoctoral Fellowship in the sociology department at the University of Alberta.

Research
John H. Simpson writes in a chapter of Lori G. Beaman's 2006 book Religion and Canadian Society that Kent "finds himself on the cult side of the cult/new religious movement divide." Simpson recommends Kent for further reading on the group the Children of God and notes: "He has done extensive research on new religious movements and argues that we need to be careful about minimizing the risks of involvement with such groups. His work is a good example of the issues taken up by scholars who focus on 'cults.'" Kent has devoted significant study to the Children of God, and the group's founder David Berg. He has researched testimony of individuals that have alleged Satanic ritual abuse, in a period from the 1930s to 1980s. Kevin J. Christiano notes in the book Sociology of Religion: Contemporary Developments that Kent's research "shows that the Bible and biblical themes provide the primary references for the articulation of abuse", noting that "purported cult ceremonies particularly used biblical references and metaphors." Irving Hexham commented about Kent in a 2001 article in Nova Religio, "The one exception to the generally neutral tone of Canadian academics and their rejection of anticult rhetoric is Stephen Kent, who has been outspoken in his criticism of many new religions, particularly Scientology, and who works closely with various anticult groups. Although Kent's views are widely known, few Canadian academics agree with his findings and most disagree quite strongly because of his tendency to use the testimony of ex-members." Sociologist Anson Shupe and Susan J. Darnell characterised Kent as "eccentric", stating that research and police enquiries into the allegations of satanic ritual human sacrifice had proved them to be unfounded. Criminologist Michael Salter, however, views Kent's work on ritual abuse more favorably.

With fellow sociologist Theresa Krebs, Kent has written about instances of "when scholars know sin". In their book Denying History, authors Michael Shermer and Alex Grobman note "Sociologists are aware of the problem of a researcher's 'co-option' by a group – a cult or New Age religion, perhaps – whereby the scholar, in entering a group and spending considerable time with its members, publishes a paper or book that is not as objective as he or she may believe." Shermer and Grobman cite Kent and Krebs's work, commenting "In fact, the sociologists Stephen Kent and Theresa Krebs have identified numerous cases of 'when scholars know sin,' where allegedly nonpartisan, unbiased scholars find themselves the unwitting tools of religious groups striving for social acceptance and in need of the imprimatur of an academic."

Kent's research of Scientology has focused on its organization, the Rehabilitation Project Force (RPF). His extensive study of Scientology's history and practices led him to conclude that as a result of relatively young people becoming involved with the organization in the 1960–70s, some second-generation Scientologist children have left the group in "waves". Kent has commented to the media about Scientology's RPF, and Scientology's "Ethics" system, as well as its affiliated organization Narconon. He has published articles concerning Scientology and Hollywood, and commented that Scientology uses celebrities as "public relations officers for Scientology, and part of their mission is to represent Scientology to the outside world and to other governments." According to CBS News, "[h]e's considered one of the foremost experts on Scientology. But inside the church, he's considered an anti-religious extremist who has been paid to testify against the church in court." The editor-in-chief of The Village Voice referred to Kent as an academic "who studies Scientology in depth", and the St. Petersburg Times referred to Kent as "an expert on the group". Kent has testified as an expert witness for parties suing organizations affiliated with Scientology, and subsequently Scientologists picketed outside of his University of Alberta office. Religious studies scholar J. Gordon Melton and Church of Scientology spokesperson Leisa Goodman have both questioned the accuracy of Kent's scholarship. Kent responded to both critics, noting their breaches of ethics and poor research practices.

Sociologist Lorne Dawson has criticized Kent's work for his use of ex-member testimony. In response to Dawson and other critics who have issues with ex-member testimony, Kent argues that former member accounts provide outsider insights not available to members who misattribute divine authority to leaders in high demand religious groups. Additionally, the methodological considerations raised by Dawson do not end at ex-member testimony, given that much of his critique was "prepared at the request of the Church of Scientology" as part of his employment as an expert witness. Relying on member testimony raises the important issue of how researchers' sympathies influence their work. As part of their response to a general call for a critical sociology of religion, Thomas J. Josephsohn and Rhys H. Williams argue that sociology of religion's focus on the beneficial aspects of religion has tended to ignore "some significant and darker aspects of religion such as violence, terrorism, prejudice, and social closure".

From Slogans to Mantras
Kent's book From Slogans to Mantras: Social Protest and Religious Conversion in the Late Vietnam Era was published in 2001 by Syracuse University Press. In the book, Kent explored how political activists from the period of the Vietnam War later turned to alternative religious movements including Hare Krishnas, Transcendental Meditation, Scientology, and the Unification Church. In 2003 it was cited by Choice as an outstanding academic title that should be owned by every library.

Publishers Weekly described From Slogans to Mantras as a "lucid and economical study", noting that Kent had examined the convergence between the interest of American youth in radical politics and protest and the pursuit of "unusual, cultish, spiritual traditions." James A. Overbeck wrote in Library Journal that the work is recommended for academic and public libraries, mentioning that Kent utilized personal narratives and alternative press in the book. Doni Whitsett reviewed the book in Cultic Studies Review, writing that it contained informative content, and is an easy read free of sociological jargon which made it more accessible to non-expert readers. However, Whitsett also stated that it would have been interesting to compare those who did not choose the route of the ex-members described in the book and to analyze the differences inherent in these two subsets of individuals. Jill K. Gill reviewed the book in Humanities and Social Sciences Online and also commented on its readability, stating that it was succinctly written and engaging.

Peter W. Williams reviewed the book in The Journal of American History and provided a less positive review, saying that the book was a "mildly interesting and useful footnote to the sixties" but that he wished the book had gone further than that. Massimo Introvigne, president of pro-NRM (new religious movement) advocacy group CESNUR also gave the work a critical review for what he described as "the author's well-known harsh criticism of NRMs".

Awards and recognition
In 2003, Kent's book From Slogans to Mantras was cited by Choice: Current Reviews for Academic Libraries as an "Outstanding Academic Title" that should be owned by every library. Kent was recognized by his students at the University of Alberta in 2009. He received a "Graduate Student Supervisor Award" from the Graduate Students' Association on March 12, 2009. In April 2010, Kent received the "Bill Meloff Memorial Teaching Award" given by the Department of Sociology at the University of Alberta. He stated he would utilize the 1,000 USD award to "update the department's DVD collections in the sociology of deviance and the sociology of religion".

Works 

 Books

 From slogans to mantras: social protest and religious conversion in the late Vietnam war era,  Syracuse University press, 2001, 

 Edited Volume

Cristina Caparesi, Mario Di Fiorino, and Stephen A. Kent (Editors) Costretti ad Amare: Saggi sui Bambini di Dio/The Family. Forte dei Marmi: Centro Studi Psichiatria e Territorio, (2002). 

Book chapters

"New Religious Movements," in The Sociology of Religion: A Canadian Focus.  Edited by Ted Hewitt.  New York: Butterworths, 1993: 83–106.
(co-author with Charles Hobart).  "Religion and Societies," in Introduction to Sociology, 2nd Edition.  Edited by David Pierce and Bill Meloff.  Scarborough, Ontario: Nelson Canada (1994): 311–339.
(second author with Gordon Drever). "Gods From Afar," in Edmonton: The Life of a City. Edited by Bob Hesketh and Frances Swyripa. Edmonton: NeWest Press (1995): 275–282.
"Brainwashing Programs in The Family/Children of God and Scientology." in Misunderstanding Cults: Searching for Objectivity in a Controversial Field. Edited by Benjamin Zablocki and Thomas Robbins. Toronto: University of Toronto Press: 2001: 349–378.
"Compelling Evidence: A Rejoinder to Lorne Dawson's Chapter." in Misunderstanding Cults: Searching for Objectivity in a Controversial Field.  Edited by Benjamin Zablocki and Thomas Robbins. Toronto: University of Toronto Press: 2001: 401–411.
"Seven Thousand 'Hand-Maids and Daughters of the Lord': Lincolnshire and Cheshire Quaker Women's Anti-Tithe Protests in Late Interregnum and Restoration England." In Women, Gender and Radical Religion in Early Modern Europe.  Edited by Sylvia Brown. Leiden: E.J. Brill: 2007: 65–96.
 "Post World War II New Religious Movements in the West." In The World's Religions: Continuities and Transformations. 2nd Edition. Edited by Peter Clarke and Peter Beyer. New York: Routledge: 2008: 492–510.
"Harm, Human Rights, and the Continued Criminalization of Fundamentalist Mormon Polygamy." Fundamentalism, Politics, and the Law.  Edited by Marci Hamilton and Mark Rozell. New York: Palgrave: 2011: 161–192.
"The Decline of Scientology," In Dialog in Konfrontation—und die Wahrheit wird sie frei machen: Eine Festschrift fur Thomas Gandow. Edited by Christoph Polster and Ede Ingolf Christiansen. Jena: Jenaer Akademische Verlagsgesellschaft.

 Articles

 Valentinian Gnosticism and Classical Samkhya—A Thematic and Structural Comparison, Philosophy East and West 30 no.2 (April, 1980): 241–259.
 Puritan Radicalism and the New Religious Organizations: Seventeen the Century England and Contemporary America, Comparative Social Research 10, (1987): 3–46.
 Scientology's Relationship With Eastern Religious Traditions   Berliner Dialog Heft 1-97 
 Lustful Prophet: A Psychosexual Historical Study of the Children of God's Leader, David Berg, Cultic Studies Journal Volume 11 No. 2 : 135–188, 1994
 Misattribution and Social Control in the Children of God, Journal of Religion and Health. 33 No.1,: 29–43, 1994.
Brainwashing in Scientology's Rehabilitation Project Force (RPF), 1997
 When Scholars Know Sin , Skeptic Magazine Vol. 6, No. 3, 1998.
 The Globalization of Scientology, Religion 29, 1999: 147–169.
 Clarifying Contentious Issues: A Rejoinder to Melton, Shupe, and Lewis Skeptic 7 No.1, 1999, 21–26.
 Scientology -- Is this a Religion?  Marburg Journal of Religion, Volume 4, No. 1, 1999.
 The Creation of 'Religious' Scientology, Religious Studies and Theology, 18 No. 2, 1999.
 The French and German versus American Debate over 'New Religions', Scientology, and Human Rights , Marburg Journal of Religion, Volume 6,  No. 1, 2001.
 Exit Counseling and the Decline of Deprogramming., Cultic Studies Review 1 No.3, 2002.
 Generational Revolt by the Adult Children of First-Generation Members of the Children of God/The Family, Cultic Studies Review 3 No. 1, 2004.
 "Hollywood's Celebrity-Lobbyists and the Clinton Administration's American Foreign Policy Toward German Scientology." Journal of Religion and Popular Culture 1 (Spring 2002) at https://web.archive.org/web/20130107070133/http://www.usask.ca/relst/jrpc/articles.html
"Spiritual Kinship and New Religions." Religious Studies and Theology 22 No. 1 (2003): 85–100.
"Scientology and the European Human Rights Debate: A Reply to Leisa Goodman, J. Gordon Melton, and the European Rehabilitation Project Force Study." Marburg Journal of Religion 8 No. 1 (September 2003) 
(co-author with Doni Whitsett). "Cults and Families." Families in Society (October–December 2003):491-502; Reprinted in Cultic Studies Review 3 No. 2 (2004).
 "'Early' Sa-m.khya in the Buddhacarita," Philosophy East and West 32 no. 3 (July 1982):     259–278; available at: http://ccbs.ntu.edu.tw/FULLTEXT/JR-PHIL/kent.htm.
 "'Hand-Maids and Daughters of the Lord': Quaker Women, Quaker Families, and Somerset's Anti-Tithe Petition in 1659." Quaker History 97 No. 1 (Spring 2008): 32–61.
"A Sectarian Interpretation of the Rise of Mahayana," Religion 12 (1982): 311–322.
"A Matter of Principle: Fundamentalist Mormon Polygamy, Children, and Human Rights Debates." Nova Religio: The Journal of Alternative and Emergent Religions 10 Issue 1 (2006): 7–29.
 "Contemporary Uses of the Brainwashing Concept: 2000 to Mid-2007." Cultic Studies Review 7 No. 2 (2008, forthcoming). 30pp.
"Deviance Labelling and Normative Strategies in the Canadian 'New Religions/Countercult' Debate," Canadian Journal of Sociology 15 no.4 (1990): 393–416.
 "Deviant Scriptualism and Ritual Satanic Abuse" Part Two: "Possible Mormon, Magick, and Pagan Influences." Religion 23 no.4 (October 1993): 355–367.
"Diabolic Debates: A Reply to David Frankfurter and J. S. La Fontaine," Religion 24 (1994): 361–378.
"Education and Re-education in Ideological Organizations and Their Implications for Children." Cultic Studies Review 4 No. 2 (2005): 119–145.
"Mysticism, Quakerism, and Relative Deprivation: A Sociological Reply to R.A. Naulty," Religion 19 (1989): 157–178.
 "Narcissistic Fraud in the Ancient World: Lucian's Account of Alexander of Abonuteichos and the Cult of Glycon." Ancient Narrative 6 (2007): 77–99, 161.
"Psychological and Mystical Interpretations of Early Quakerism: William James and Rufus Jones," Religion 17 (1987): 251–274.
"Psychology and Quaker Mysticism: The Legacy of William James and Rufus Jones," Quaker History 76 no. 1 (Spring 1987): 1–17.
"Radical Rhetoric and Mystical Religion in America's Late Vietnam War Era." Religion 23 no.1 (January 1993): 45–60.
"Deviant Scripturalism and Ritual Satanic Abuse. Part One: Possible Judeo-Christian  Influences." Religion 23 no.3 (July 1993): 229–241.
"Relative Deprivation and Resource Mobilization: A Study of Early Quakerism," British Journal of Sociology 33 no. 4 (December 1982): 529–544.
"Scientific Evaluation of the Dangers Posed by Religious Groups: A Partial Model."  Cultic Studies Review 3 No. 2/3 (2004); 101–134; Revised Reprint in The New Religious Question: State Regulation or State Interference? Edited by Pauline Côté and Jeremy T. Gunn. Berlin: Peter Lang: 343–370.
"Slogan Chanters to Mantra Chanters: A Mertonian Deviance Analysis of Conversion to the Religious Organizations of the Early 1970s," Sociological Analysis 49 no. 2 (1988): 104–118; Reprinted in Sights on the Sixties, edited by Barbara L. Tischler. New Brunswick, New Jersey: Rutgers University Press, 1992.
"The 'Papist' Charges Against the Interregnum Quakers," Journal of Religious History 12 (1982): 180–190.
"The Quaker Ethic and the Fixed Price Policy: Max Weber and Beyond," Sociological Inquiry 53 no.1 (February, 1983): 16–32; Revised Reprint in Time, Place, and Circumstance: Neo-Weberian Essays in Religion, Culture, and Society. Edited by William Swatos. Westport, Connecticut: Greenwood Press, 1990: 139–150, 198–201.
"Weber, Goethe, and the Nietzschean Allusion: Capturing the Source of the 'Iron Cage' Metaphor," Sociological Analysis 44 no. 4 (Winter 1983): 297–319.
"Weber, Goethe, and William Penn: Themes of Marital Love," Sociological Analysis 46 no. 3 (1985): 315–320.
(second author with Robert H. Cartwright). "Social Control in Alternative Religions: A Familial Perspective." Sociological Analysis (Winter 1992): 345–361.
(with James Spickard). "The 'Other' Civil Religion and the Tradition of Radical Quaker Politics." Journal of Church and State (Spring 1994): 301–315.
(with Theresa Krebs). "Academic Compromise in the Social Scientific Study of Alternative Religions." Nova Religio 2 No.1 (October 1998): 44–54
(first author with Deana Hall). "Brainwashing and Re-Indoctrination Programs in the Children of God/The Family." Cultic Studies Journal 17 (2000): 56–78.
"The French and German Versus American Debate Over 'New Religions,' Scientology, and Human Rights." Marburg Journal of Religion 6 No. 1 (January 2001)
"Hollywood's Celebrity-Lobbyists and the Clinton Administration's American Foreign Policy Toward German Scientology." Journal of Religion and Popular Culture 1 (Spring 2002)
(first author with Joe Szimhart). "Exit Counseling and the Decline of Deprogramming." Cultic Studies Review 1 No.3 (2002): 241–291; Reprinted in The Phenomenon of Cults From A Scientific Perspective, Edited by Piotr T. Nowakowski. Cracow, Poland: Dom Wydawniczy Rafael, 2007: 327–367. 
"Spiritual Kinship and New Religions." Religious Studies and Theology 22 No. 1 (2003): 85–100.
(co-author with Doni Whitsett). "Cults and Families." Families in Society (October–December 2003):491-502; Reprinted in Cultic Studies Review 3 No. 2 (2004): 491–502.
"Generational Revolt by the Adult Children of First-Generation Members of the Children of God/The Family." Cultic Studies Review 3 No. 1 (2004): 56–72.
"Scientific Evaluation of the Dangers Posed by Religious Groups: A Partial Model."  Cultic Studies Review 3 No. 2/3 (2004); 101–134; Revised Reprint in The New Religious Question: State Regulation or State Interference? Edited by Pauline Côté and Jeremy T. Gunn. Berlin: Peter Lang: 343–370.
"Education and Re-education in Ideological Organizations and Their Implications for Children." Cultic Studies Review 4 No. 2 (2005): 119–145.
"A Matter of Principle: Fundamentalist Mormon Polygamy, Children, and Human Rights Debates." Nova Religio: The Journal of Alternative and Emergent Religions 10 Issue 1 (2006): 7–29.
"Narcissistic Fraud in the Ancient World: Lucian's Account of Alexander of Abonuteichos and the Cult of Glycon." Ancient Narrative 6 (2007): 77–99, 161; reprinted in Cultic Studies Review 7 No. 3 (2008): 225–253.
"'Hand-Maids and Daughters of the Lord': Quaker Women, Quaker Families, and Somerset's Anti-Tithe Petition in 1659." Quaker History 97 No. 1 (Spring 2008): 32–61.
"Contemporary Uses of the Brainwashing Concept: 2000 to Mid-2007." Cultic Studies Review 7 No. 2 (2008): 99–128.
(co-author with Jodi Lane). "Politiques de Rage et Narcissisme Malin [on Scientology's L. Ron Hubbard]." Criminologie 41 No. 2 (2008): 117–155.
"House of Judah, the Northeast Kingdom Community, and 'the Jonestown Problem': Downplaying Child Physical Abuses and Ignoring Serious Evidence." International Journal of Cultic Studies 1 No. 1 (2010): 27–48.
(first author with Terra A, Manca).  "A War Over Mental Health Professionalism: Scientology Versus Psychiatry." Mental Health, Religion & Culture ifirst (2012): 1–23.
"Religious Justifications for Child Sexual Abuse in Cults and New Religions." International Journal of Cultic Studies 3 (2012): 49–73.
(first author with Robin Willey). "Sects, Cults, and the Attack on Jurisprudence." Rutgers Journal of Law and Religion (Spring 2013): 306–360.
"Freemen, Sovereign Citizens, and the Challenge to Public Order in British Heritage Countries." International Journal of Cultic Studies 6 (2015): 1–15.
(co-author with Jonathan Simmons). "An Expansion of the Rational Choice Approach: Social Control in the Children of God during the 1970s and 1980s." International Journal for the Study of New Religions 6/1 (2015): 27–49.

Institute publications

 "Scientology in the United States." in Wie umgehen mit Scientology? Ein internationaler Vergleich.  Edited by Christian Koecke. Konrad Adenauer Stiftung Interne Studie Nr. 152/1998.  Sant Augustin, Germany (April 1998): 15–24.
 "Scientology in Canada."in Wie umgehen mit Scientology? Ein internationaler Vergleich. Edited by Christian Koecke. Konrad Adenauer Stiftung Interne Studie Nr. 152/1998. Sant Augustin, Germany (April 1998): 25–31.	
Gehirnwäsche im Rehabilitation Project Force (RPF) der Scientology-Organisation. Freie und Hansestadt Hamburg [Germany], Behörde für Inneres–Arbeitsgruppe Scientology und Landeszentrale für politische Bildung. (October 2000): 72 pp.; in English as Brainwashing in Scientology's Rehabilitation Project Force (RPF).  Behörde für Inneres–Arbeitsgruppe Scientology und Landeszentrale für politische Bildung. (October 2000): 63 pp.

Popular press

(co-author with Theresa Krebs). "When Scholars Know Sin: Alternative Religions and Their Academic Supporters." Skeptic 6 No.3 (1998): 36–44; Located on the World Wide Web at: <http://www.gospelcom.net/apologeticsindex/c25.html>.
"Zur wissenschaftlichen Untersuchung von Religionen und neuen religiosen Bewegungen." Berliner Dialog Heft 2 (1998): 4–8.
(co-author with Theresa Krebs). "Clarifying Contentious Issues: A Rejoinder to Melton, Shupe, and Lewis." Skeptic 7 No.1 (1999): 21–26; Located on the World Wide Web at: http://www.gospelcom.net/apologeticsindex/c40.html>.

Reviews

Gordon Marshall, In Search of the Spirit of Capitalism: An Essay on Max Weber's   Protestant Ethic Thesis. Journal for the Scientific Study of Religion 22 no.4 (December 1983): 388, 390.
E. Burke Rochford, Jr. Hare Krishna in America. Canadian Journal of Sociology 10 no. 3 (Summer 1987): 153–157.
Douglas Curran, In Advance of the Landing: Folk Concepts of Outer Space. Sociological Analysis 49 no.2 (1988): 197–198.
Randall Collins, Max Weber: A Skeleton Key. Sociological Analysis 49 no.3 (1988): 314–315.
Review of "The Sage Qualitative Research Methods Series: Vols.1-7." Canadian Review of Sociology and Anthropology 26: 848–852.
Miriam Williams, Heaven's Harlots: My Fifteen Years as a Sacred Prostitute in the Children of God Cult. Nova Religio 3 No. 1 (1999): 163–167.
Rosemary Hamilton, Hellbent for Enlightenment: Sex, Power, and Death with a Notorious Master. Nova Religio 6 No. 1 (October 2002): 204–206.
James D. Chancellor, Life in The Family: An Oral History of the Children of God. Nova Religio 8 No. 1 (July 2004): 108–112.
Roger O'Toole, Religion: Classic Sociological Approaches. Canadian Journal of Sociology 10, (1985): 322–324.
Said Arjomand, The Shadow of God and the Hidden Imam: Religion, Political Order, and Societal Change in Shi'ite Iran from the Beginning to 1890.  Sociological Analysis 47 no.4 (Winter 1987): 369–370.
E. Burke Rochford, Jr. Hare Krishna in America. Canadian Journal of Sociology 10 no. 3 (Summer 1987): 153–157.
Douglas Curran, In Advance of the Landing: Folk Concepts of Outer Space. Sociological Analysis 49 no.2 (1988): 197–198.
Randall Collins, Max Weber: A Skeleton Key. Sociological Analysis 49 no.3 (1988): 314–315.
Review of "The Sage Qualitative Research Methods Series: Vols.1-7." Canadian Review of Sociology and Anthropology 26: 848–852.
Miriam Williams, Heaven's Harlots: My Fifteen Years as a Sacred Prostitute in the Children of God Cult. Nova Religio 3 No. 1 (1999): 163–167.
Rosemary Hamilton, Hellbent for Enlightenment: Sex, Power, and Death with a Notorious Master. Nova Religio 6 No. 1 (October 2002): 204–206.
James D. Chancellor, Life in The Family: An Oral History of the Children of God. Nova Religio 8 No. 1 ((July 2004): 108–112.

See also

Anthropology of religion
Anti-cult movement
List of cult and new religious movement researchers
List of sociologists
Rehabilitation Project Force
Sociology of religion
Social psychology

References

External links

Canadian religion academics
Canadian sociologists
Critics of The Family International
Critics of Scientology
Critics of the Unification Church
Academic staff of the University of Alberta
Researchers of new religious movements and cults
Sociologists of religion
Living people
University of Maryland, College Park alumni
American University alumni
McMaster University alumni
Articles containing video clips
Satanic ritual abuse hysteria in the United States
Year of birth missing (living people)